The House of Toys is a 1920 American silent drama film directed by George L. Cox and starring Seena Owen, Pell Trenton, and Helen Jerome Eddy.

Cast
 Seena Owen as Shirley Lord 
 Pell Trenton as David Quentin 
 Helen Jerome Eddy as Esther Summers 
 Lillian Leighton as Aunt Clara 
 George Hernandez as Jonathan Radbourne 
 Stanhope Wheatcroft as Richard Holden
 Henry A. Barrows (Undetermined Role)
 Marian Skinner (Undetermined Role)
 William Buckley (Undetermined Role)
 Perry Banks (Undetermined Role)

References

Bibliography
 Goble, Alan. The Complete Index to Literary Sources in Film. Walter de Gruyter, 1999.

External links

1920 films
1920 drama films
Silent American drama films
Films directed by George L. Cox
American silent feature films
1920s English-language films
Pathé Exchange films
American black-and-white films
1920s American films